Stony Rapids is a northern hamlet in Northern Saskatchewan, Canada. This river connects the community to Fond-du-Lac, Uranium City and Camsell Portage.

Demographics 

Transportation 
 Saskatchewan Highway 905 runs from Highway 102 to Stony Rapids. A  section between Points North Landing and Black Lake is a seasonal winter road.
A winter ice road connects Fond-du-Lac and Uranium City.
Like most northern communities, Stony Rapids relies on its Stony Rapids Airport and Stony Rapids Water Aerodrome for vital transportation.

Health care 

The Athabasca Health Facility completed in 2003 at the cost of $12.7 million provides health care services to the Athabasca region. The hospital, located on reserve land (Chicken 224) of the Black Lake Dene Nation adjacent to Stony Rapids, is part of the Athabasca Health Authority.

Climate
Stony Rapids has a subarctic climate (Köppen Dfc) with long, severe winters and short, mild to warm summers. Unlike towns further west, temperature above  are very rare during winter, occurring on average only 1.5 times from December to February.

Summers are mild to warm with frequent light rain, although 3.4 days per summer reach . The average frost-free period is eighty-one days from 9 June to 30 August, though temperatures below  have occurred a handful of times in July.

See also 

 List of communities in Saskatchewan

References 

Division No. 18, Saskatchewan
Northern hamlets in Saskatchewan
Road-inaccessible communities of Saskatchewan
Dene communities